The Point Street Bridge is a movable bridge that crosses the Providence River in Providence, Rhode Island, carrying Point Street from the Jewelry District to Wickenden Street at the base of College Hill.

History 
The first bridge at this site was built in 1872. It consisted of a swing span  in length with two  shore spans. In 1907, each of the approach spans was divided into three plate-girder spans carried on new granite piers and abutments.

The current bridge is the third at this site.  It is also a swing bridge and was built by the Boston Bridge Works in 1927.  The bridge is no longer moveable but fixed in place to allow Point Street traffic to cross.  It was last swung open in 1959. The Fox Point Hurricane Barrier, downstream of the Point Street Bridge and completed in 1966, rendered the swing feature of little value, because the Barrier blocks large vessels from traveling upstream before the bridge would.

After WW-II, Route 1A became a major route carrying traffic from southern RI to the East Side of Providence, and points east. The Point Street Bridge was part of that route, and on exceptionally hot summer days, the bridge would expand after it opened, and with nowhere to bleed off the heat, it expanded to a point where it couldn't be closed. Traffic built up for several miles and fire tankers had to be summoned to shoot water on the bridge until it shrunk back to a size (only an inch or two) so it could be closed and let traffic resume.

Bicycle lane markings were added to the bridge as part of the city's 2013 Bicycle Master Plan.

See also

References

External links 

A previous Point Street Bridge from the Providence Public Library's Digital Collections

Article containing a photograph of the previous Point Street Bridge from the Providence Journal

Swing bridges in the United States
Bridges in Providence County, Rhode Island
Road bridges in Rhode Island
Bridges completed in 1927
1927 establishments in Rhode Island
Steel bridges in the United States